Peter Iver Kaufman is an American philosopher. He is the George Matthews and Virginia Brinkley Modlin Chair in Leadership Studies at the University of Richmond and is an emeritus professor of University of North Carolina at Chapel Hill.

Works

References

Living people
University of North Carolina at Chapel Hill faculty
University of Richmond faculty
American philosophers
Augustine scholars
Year of birth missing (living people)